The 2020–21 international cricket season took place from September 2020 to April 2021. 29 Tests, 49 One Day Internationals (ODIs), 50 Twenty20 Internationals (T20Is), 17 Women's One Day Internationals (WODIs) and 21 Women's Twenty20 Internationals (WT20Is) were scheduled to be played during this period. Additionally, a number of other T20I/WT20I matches were also scheduled to be played in minor series involving associate nations.

The impact of the COVID-19 pandemic continued into the 2020–21 international calendar. The 2021 Women's Cricket World Cup in New Zealand was scheduled to take place during this time, starting on 6 February 2021. However, in August 2020, this was postponed by one year because of the COVID-19 pandemic. The 2020 ICC Men's T20 World Cup was also scheduled to be played in October and November in Australia, but this was also postponed by one year due to the pandemic.

In July 2020, the men's 2020 Asia Cup, scheduled to be held in September 2020, was postponed until June 2021. In August 2020, the West Indies tour of Australia was postponed, along with India's T20I fixtures against Australia. Also in August 2020, England's ODI and T20I matches against India was rescheduled to take place in early 2021. Bangladesh's tour to Sri Lanka, originally scheduled to be played in July 2020, was moved to October 2020. On 28 August 2020, Pakistan's planned tour to South Africa was also postponed. However, in October 2020, the tour was rescheduled to take place in April 2021.

In September 2020, it was confirmed that the 2020 edition of the Women's Asia Cup, scheduled to be played in Bangladesh, had been cancelled as well. Also in September, Cricket Australia confirmed that the one-off Test match against Afghanistan, and the limited-overs series against New Zealand had both been postponed due to the pandemic. On 28 September 2020, Bangladesh's planned tour to Sri Lanka was postponed for a second time, after both cricket boards could not agree on the quarantine requirements.

International women's cricket started with the first WT20I between Australia and New Zealand, with Australia winning by 17 runs. Australia won the WT20I series 2–1, and then went on to win the WODI series between the two teams 3–0. With their 3–0, the team recorded 21 consecutive wins in the format, equalling the men's record set by Ricky Ponting's team in the 2002–03 season. International men's cricket started with Zimbabwe's tour of Pakistan, with Pakistan winning the first ODI match by 26 runs. In November 2020, Ireland and Scotland women's planned tour to Spain was the next series to be cancelled due to the COVID-19 pandemic, after Scotland withdrew from the series. In December 2020, England's ODI matches against South Africa were postponed following a COVID-19 outbreak. On 31 December 2020, Cricket Australia confirmed that the India women's tour of Australia, scheduled to take place in January 2021, had been postponed by one year.

In December 2020, the International Cricket Council (ICC) announced a revised schedule for fixtures that had been postponed due to the pandemic that formed part of the qualification pathway for the 2023 Cricket World Cup. These included the Cricket World Cup League 2 matches scheduled to be played in Namibia and Nepal, and the Cricket World Cup Challenge League series originally planned to be played in Malaysia. In January 2021, Ireland were scheduled to play four ODIs in the UAE against the hosts. However, two matches were cancelled following a COVID-19 scare within the UAE's team, resulting in the tour schedule being changed on multiple occasions. Disruption continued into February 2021, with Australia's planned tour of South Africa being postponed, and Pakistan women's tour of Zimbabwe being cut short after one match, following flight restrictions from Harare to Pakistan. Rounds six and seven of the ICC Cricket World Cup League 2 tournament, scheduled to take place in Oman and Papua New Guinea respectively, were also postponed.

In January and February 2021, South Africa toured Pakistan for the first time in fourteen years, playing two Tests and three T20I matches. During the tour, Pakistan became the first men's team to win 100 T20I matches. In April 2021, the Australia women's cricket team set a new record of twenty-two consecutive wins in ODI cricket, breaking Ricky Ponting's team record from 2002 to 2003, when they beat New Zealand by six wickets.

Season overview

Rankings

The following were the rankings at the beginning of the season.

On-going tournaments
The following were the rankings at the beginning of the season.

September

2020 Asia Cup

The T20I tournament was postponed in July 2020 due to the COVID-19 pandemic.

2020 Women's Twenty20 Asia Cup

The WT20I tournament was postponed in September 2020 due to the COVID-19 pandemic.

New Zealand women in Australia

October

West Indies in Australia

The tour was postponed in August 2020 due to the COVID-19 pandemic.

Zimbabwe in Sri Lanka
The tour was scheduled to take place in October 2020, but did not take place, before being rescheduled for January 2022.

Zimbabwe in Pakistan

November

India in Australia

The T20I fixtures were originally scheduled to take place in October 2020, but were rescheduled for December 2020 after the T20 World Cup was moved back a year due to the COVID-19 pandemic.

West Indies in New Zealand

Ireland women against Scotland women in Spain

The tour was cancelled in November 2020 due to the COVID-19 pandemic.

England in South Africa

The ODI matches were postponed in December 2020 due to the COVID-19 pandemic.

December

Afghanistan in Australia
The tour was postponed in September 2020 due to the COVID-19 pandemic. In December 2020, the Afghanistan Cricket Board rescheduled the match for November 2021.

Pakistan in New Zealand

Sri Lanka in South Africa

January

Ireland in United Arab Emirates

Two of the four matches were cancelled due to COVID-19.

England in Sri Lanka

West Indies in Bangladesh

Pakistan women in South Africa

Ireland vs Afghanistan in the UAE

New Zealand in Australia
The tour was postponed in September 2020 due to the COVID-19 pandemic. In May 2021, Cricket Australia rescheduled the tour to take place in January and February 2022.

South Africa in Pakistan

February

England in India

The ODI and T20I matches were originally scheduled to be played in September to October 2020, but they were rescheduled due to the COVID-19 pandemic.

Pakistan women in Zimbabwe

The tour was cancelled in February 2021 due to flight restrictions.

Australia in New Zealand

England women in New Zealand

March

Zimbabwe vs Afghanistan in the UAE

Sri Lanka in West Indies

South Africa women in India

Bangladesh in New Zealand

Australia women in New Zealand

2021 Oman Tri-Nation Series
The series was postponed in February 2021 due to the COVID-19 pandemic, and rescheduled for September 2021.

Australia in South Africa
The tour was postponed in February 2021 due to the COVID-19 pandemic.

April

Pakistan in South Africa

The tour was originally scheduled to be played in October 2020, but postponed in August 2020 due to the COVID-19 pandemic. In October 2020, Cricket South Africa announced that the tour had been rescheduled for April 2021.

2021 Papua New Guinea Tri-Nation Series
The series was postponed in February 2021 due to the COVID-19 pandemic.

Bangladesh in Sri Lanka

The Test matches were originally scheduled to be played in July and August 2020, but the tour was moved to October 2020, due to the COVID-19 pandemic. However, in September 2020, the tour was postponed again after neither cricket board could agree on the quarantine requirements. In February 2021, the Bangladesh Cricket Board (BCB) announced that they would be touring Sri Lanka in April 2021 to play two Test matches.

Pakistan in Zimbabwe

See also
 Associate international cricket in 2020–21
 Impact of the COVID-19 pandemic on cricket

Notes

References

2020 in cricket
2021 in cricket